Oreta pavaca is a species of moth of the family Drepanidae first described by Frederic Moore in 1866. It is found in China, India and Nepal.

The length of the forewings is 18.5–25.5 mm for males and 21.5–26.5 mm for females. The coloration and colour pattern of the wings distinguish this species from the rest of this species group.

Subspecies
Oreta pavaca pavaca (northern India, Sikkim, Nepal, China: Yunnan, Tibet)
Oreta pavaca sinensis Watson, 1967 (China: Zhejiang, Hubei, Jiangxi, Hunan, Fujian, Guangdong, Guangxi, Sichuan, Chongqing, Guizhou)

References

Moths described in 1866
Drepaninae